Keezletown is a Census-designated place in Rockingham County, in the U.S. state of Virginia. It is located northeast of Harrisonburg. It is for the first time listed as such for the United States Census 2020.

References

Unincorporated communities in Rockingham County, Virginia
Census-designated places in Rockingham County, Virginia
Census-designated places in Virginia